The Bengal Film Journalists' Association Awards is the oldest Association of Film critics in India, founded in 1937. Frequent winners  include Rajesh Khanna (4 awards), Dilip Kumar, Raj Kapoor, Aamir Khan, Ajay Devgan, Amitabh Bachchan, Hrithik Roshan (2 each). Rajesh Khanna was nominated for the Best Actor award 25 times between 1969 and 1991.

1930s 
 1938:
 1939:

1940s 
 1940: - No award given
 1941: - No award given
 1942: Gajanan Jagirdar - Padosi
 1943: - No award given
 1944:
 1945: Gajanan Jagirdar - Ramshastri
 1946: Prithviraj Kapoor - Devdasi
 1947:
 1948:
 1949:

1950s 
 1950:
 1951:
 1952:
 1953:
 1954:
 1955:
 1956:
 1957:
 1958:
 1959:

1960s 
 1960:
 1961:
 1962: Dilip Kumar - Gunga Jumna
 1963: Guru Dutt - Sahib Bibi Aur Ghulam
 1964: Ashok Kumar - Gumrah
 1965:
 1966:
 1967: Raj Kapoor - Teesri Kasam
 1968:
 1969: Dilip Kumar - Sunghursh

1970s 
 1970: Ashok Kumar - Aashirwad
 1971: Raj Kapoor - Mera Naam Joker
 1972: Rajesh Khanna - Anand
 1973: Rajesh Khanna - Bawarchi
 1974: Sanjeev Kumar - Koshish
 1975: Rajesh Khanna - Namak Haraam
 1976: Amitabh Bachchan - Mili
 1977: 
 1978:
 1979:

1980 
 1980:
 1981:
 1982:
 1983:
 1984:
 1985:
 1986: Naseeruddin Shah - Paar
 1987: Rajesh Khanna - Amrit
 1988: Sadhu Meher - Debshishu
 1989: Shashi Kapoor - New Delhi Times

1990s 
 1990:
 1991:
 1992: Pankaj Kapoor - Ek Doctor Ki Maut
 1993: Om Puri - Current
 1994: 
 1995: Paresh Rawal - Sardar	
 1996: Aamir Khan - Akele Hum Akele Tum & Rangeela
 1997: Ashish Vidyarthi - Is Raat Ki Subah Nahin
 1998: 
 1999:  Ajay Devgan - Zakhm

2000s 
 2000: Manoj Bajpai - Shool
 2001: Hrithik Roshan - Fiza
 2002: Aamir Khan - Lagaan
 2003: Ajay Devgan - The Legend of Bhagat Singh
 2004: Sanjay Dutt - Munna Bhai M.B.B.S.
 2005: Nana Patekar - Ab Tak Chhappan
 2006: Amitabh Bachchan - Black
 2007: Hrithik Roshan - Krrish
 2008: - No award given
 2009: - No award given

2010s 
 2010: - No award given
 2011: - No award given
 2012: - No award given
 2013: - No award given

See also

 BFJA Awards
 Bollywood
 Cinema of India

Bengal Film Journalists' Association Awards